The Soom Shale is a member of the Late Ordovician (Hirnantian) Cederberg Formation (Table Mountain Group) in South Africa, renowned for its remarkable preservation of soft-tissue in fossil material.
Deposited in still waters, the unit lacks bioturbation, perhaps indicating anoxic conditions.

It overlies the Pakhuis tillite and is overlain by the Disa Siltstone.

It contains typical Ordovician microfossils, such as chitinozoa, acritarchs and spores, and its shelly fauna is also typical of this time period.

Its macrofauna comprises pelagic organisms that sank rapidly to a barren sea floor. These include brachiopods, eurypterids, conodonts, nektaspids, trilobites and orthoconic cephalopods.

Environment of formation 
The environment of deposition is considered to be anoxic and occasionally euxinic cold bottom waters, as indicated by the lack of bioturbation and most epibenthic fauna, besides a small amount of transiently colonizing brachiopods during temporary oxic conditions. It was deposited in the immediate aftermath of the Hirnantian glaciation, the most likely primary cause of the Late Ordovician mass extinction.

Preservation 
The preservation of fossils in the Soom Shale is the opposite of that of normal fossil deposits. Things that in typical preservation conditions are not preserved in the fossil record like soft tissue are preserved in exquisite detail. While hard parts (exoskeleton, etc.) that are normally preserved in the fossil record are demineralized, and are therefore by comparison poorly preserved, usually being preserved in the form of a mould. There is almost no taphonomic distortion, with little evidence of transport, current alignment and no evidence of scavenging. The process of preservation for soft tissues is under debate, but possibly could involve replacement by aluminosilicates, but this could just be an artifact of diagenesis and metamorphism.

Biota

References

External links 
 
 
 

 
Geologic formations of South Africa
Ordovician System of Africa
Hirnantian
Shale formations
Paleontology in South Africa